William Max Little III (born March 2, 1984) is an American Major League Baseball umpire. He was promoted to a full-time position in February 2015. He attended Science Hill High School in Johnson City, Tennessee, then studied biology at Milligan College, where he continued playing baseball.

Little worked his first postseason assignment in 2016, working in the 2016 American League Wild Card Game.

Little was the first base umpire when Albert Pujols of the Los Angeles Angels hit his 600th career home run against the Minnesota Twins on June 3, 2017.

For the 2018 regular season he was found to be a Top 10 performing home plate umpire in terms of accuracy in calling balls and strikes. His error rate was 7.66 percent. This was based on a study conducted at Boston University where 372,442 pitches were culled and analyzed.

He wears #93.

References

External links

Retrosheet
Close Call sports

1984 births
Living people
Major League Baseball umpires
Sportspeople from Tennessee
People from Washington County, Tennessee
People from Greene County, Tennessee
Milligan Buffaloes baseball players
Milligan University alumni